Emil Coppetti (born 1902, date of death unknown) was a Swiss bobsledder. He competed in the four-man event at the 1928 Winter Olympics.

References

1902 births
Year of death missing
Swiss male bobsledders
Olympic bobsledders of Switzerland
Bobsledders at the 1928 Winter Olympics
Sportspeople from Zürich